Furnace is an unincorporated community located in Estill County, Kentucky, United States.

History
Settlers found the surrounding area rich in iron ore. The Estill Steam Furnace, a blast furnace was established in about 1830.

A post office was established in the community in 1857, and named for the Estill Steam Furnace. This was shortened to Furnace in 1882. The post office was discontinued in 1975.

References

External links

Unincorporated communities in Estill County, Kentucky
Unincorporated communities in Kentucky
1857 establishments in Kentucky